Robert Sibley Volcanic Regional Preserve is located in the Oakland Hills of the East Bay region of the San Francisco Bay Area, California. It can be entered from Oakland via Skyline Boulevard, or from Contra Costa County via Old Tunnel Road.

History
The park was one of the first three parks established by the East Bay Regional Parks District (EBRPD) in 1936. It was originally named Round Top Regional Park. Round Top (elevation ) is named for an extinct volcano in the Oakland Hills which started to erupt 10.2 Million years ago. It is home to at least two stone labyrinths of recent origin. The park was renamed after the second president of the EBRPD, Robert Sibley, shortly after his death. U.C. Berkeley Professor Emeritus Garniss Curtis studied the Sibley Regional Preserve extensively, dating the volcano to be 10.2 million years old. Since 10.2 million years ago, the Pacific tectonic plate has slowly pushed the volcano north.

Geology
The preserve contains a Pliocene epoch volcanic center that, about ten million years ago, produced most of the lavas that underlie the East Bay ridges from Inspiration Point in Tilden Regional Park to Moraga. Geologists refer to this local volcanism as the Moraga Volcanics. Subsequent compressive strains produced by various local faults such as the Hayward Fault folded the lava-bearing rock formations, tilting the Round Top vent complex on its side. The results of such compressive strains of local faults has altered the volcano's original landscape, and Round Top now tilts towards the east. Such local faults, notably Hayward and Moraga, have also caused the volcano to form a trough that is the Siesta/Gateway Valley.

Folding, erosion, and a quarry operation exposed a cross section of the volcano, providing an excellent means to study a California Coast Ranges volcano. The mountain Round Top is not the volcano. The ancient volcano has eroded away. It has also tilted on its side, so it doesn't look like a volcano. (https://www.kqed.org/news/11876393/wait-there-was-a-volcano-in-the-east-bay-hills) The construction corporation Kaiser Sand & Gravel used the region as a quarry, leaving the volcanic region open and exposed. Lava within the vent has been dated by UC Berkeley at 9.5 million years old.

Rock Formations 
The region has remnants of rocks from the Orinda Formation and the Claremont Formation. From the Orinda Formation rocks include "river gravel, sandstone, and mudstone." The river gravel are red in color. The sandstones are around 65 million years old. From the Claremont Formation, rocks include marine rocks.

The surface of the basalt found on the dike of Round Top are of the color "light brownish or rusty gray" and the interior of the basalt is of the color "gun steel blue."

Bake Zone 
A bake zone is a region where heat from the lava of the volcano changed the color of the surrounding rocks to red. Such rocks include rhyolite tuff, lapilli agglomerate, and vesicular basalt. Rhyolite tuff are remnants of ash from a northern volcano around 4 miles away. Lapilli agglomerate are remnants of volcanic cinders. Vesicular basalt are remnants of gas bubbles from cooling lava.

The Stone Property 
The Stone Property is a restricted region of the park. The area consists of pure basalt around 100 feet wide, as well as "autobrecciating basaltic flow" which occurs when lava continues to flow under a cooled surface.

Activities 

There are several trails in the preserve.  Most are restricted to hiking and horseback use and only a few are available for multi-purpose use. Round Top Road is paved from the visitor center to the top of Round Top. There one campgrounds or but no picnic areas in the preserve; there are plenty of benches good for a rest, view and snack. The visitor center at the Skyline Boulevard entrance is unstaffed and offers brochures for self-guided tours.  It also features depictions of the region's geology.

Hiking trails
 Round Top Road goes from the Sibley visitor center to the peak of Round Top. CLOSED
 Round Top Loop Trail circles Round Top's peak.
 Volcanic Trail, once a quarry haul road, contains most of the stops on the self-guided volcanic tour.
 Quarry Trail connects the middle of Volcanic Trail to a point lower down on Quarry Road. 
 Pond Trail is a short trail segment that descends to a couple of ponds on the north side of the preserve.

Labyrinths 
At least two man-made labyrinths exist within RSVRP. The first, and arguably most frequently visited, is known as the Mazzariello Labyrinth. Constructed in 1990 and donated as a "gift to the world" by East Bay resident Helena Mazzariello, it is a favorite destination for hikers who come to pray, meditate, and examine talismans left in the center by previous visitors. In this labyrinth, she would walk her goats, stating that, "I can enter with a question, and inevitably, I will emerge with some insight. It is a powerful spot." Notwithstanding the official gate hours listed below, Friends of the Labyrinth claims that the labyrinth has visitors 24 hours a day, 7 days a week.

The next marker along the Round Top Loop Trail leads to the Volcanic Trail, which crosses to the left. At Post No. 4, the hiker can see a smaller, heart-shaped labyrinth. It is not nearly as elaborate as the Mazzariello Labyrinth, and apparently not as heavily used.

There have been claims of other, earlier labyrinths hidden in the preserves, but Friends of the Labyrinth dismisses these as urban legends, as no evidence has been found. The organization reports that analysis of high-resolution aerial photographs show no trace of such activity.

Visiting the park
The park is open year round.  The park and gate hours are:
 November - February  7AM - 6PM
 March - October   7AM - 10PM
There is no parking fee and no dog fee.

See also
 Moraga Formation — Pliocene epoch basaltic lava formation in park.

Notes

References

External links

 "Friends of the Labyrinth" website. Accessed March 8, 2019.
 EBparks.org: Official  Robert Sibley Volcanic Regional Preserve website

Sibley Volcanic
Sibley Volcanic
Sibley Volcanic
Sibley Volcanic
Geology of Alameda County, California
Geology of Contra Costa County, California
Pliocene California
Volcanism of California
Parks in the San Francisco Bay Area